Franklin Clark Glasson (October 13, 1913 - January 2, 1994) was an American architect known for his design and construction of golf courses in the western United States primarily during the 1950s and 60s. Over his career Glasson designed, constructed (sometimes personally), and operated nine golf courses that are still in operation.

Career
Glasson was actively involved in the construction and operation of the courses he designed. He operated the Deep Cliff course in Cupertino, California from its construction in 1961 until its sale to a private golf course operator, John Telischak in 1992.

In at least one instance, on the Fall River Mills course, he did the excavation and grading work himself. This course was built on the site of a former dump and was littered with "ice boxes, car bodies, and washing machines". Glasson is said to have been excavating the site one day when his backhoe became stuck. An onlooker began laughing at his predicament and when Glasson went to confront this person he discovered it was his neighbor and then owner of the Rising River Ranch, Bing Crosby. Both gentleman laughed about the situation and went on to become friends.

Golf courses designed
The following is a list of the golf courses designed by Glasson. Ten are listed, two (Palm and Cypress) are located at the same facility.

 denotes unique feature or aspect

Personal life
Glasson was born in San Jose, California and developed an interest in the sport of golf at an early age. He caddied at the Los Altos Hills Golf and Country Club for eight years. He died in Shasta, California.

See also
List of golf course architects

References

External links
 Arrowhead Country Club golf course
 Deep Cliff golf course
 Fall River Valley golf course
 Palo Alto Country Club golf course
 Royal Vista golf course
 Shasta Valley golf course
 Sunken Gardens golf course
 Sunol Valley golf course, Cypress & Palm courses
 Twain Harte golf course
 Wikiup golf course

Golf course architects
People from San Jose, California
1913 births
1994 deaths
Businesspeople from the San Francisco Bay Area
American landscape and garden designers
California culture
Golf in California
People from Cupertino, California
20th-century American businesspeople